Orlando Pirates Sport Club are a professional Namibian football club from Katutura, Windhoek. They play in the country's highest division, the Namibia Premier League.

Achievements
Namibia Premier League: 2
1990, 2008

NFA-Cup: 3
2002, 2006, 2009

Crest

Coaches
Ali Akan
Woody Jacobs
Eric Muinjo - 2018/19 Season - Nov 2018 - Jan 2019
Lucky Kakuva - 2018/19 Season - Present

External links
 https://www.facebook.com/orlandopiratesnam/ 
 https://www.instagram.com/orlandopiratesnam/

1963 establishments in South West Africa
Association football clubs established in 1963
Football clubs in Namibia
Namibia Premier League clubs
Sport in Windhoek